WMBV (91.9 FM) is a radio station broadcasting a Religious Radio format. Licensed to Dixons Mills, Alabama, United States, the station serves the Demopolis, Alabama, area.  The station is currently owned by The Moody Bible Institute of Chicago and features programming from Salem Communications.

The station was assigned the WMBV call letters by the Federal Communications Commission on January 29, 1987. Although planning for the station began in 1982, WMBV began broadcasting on August 15, 1988.

References

External links

MBV
Radio stations established in 1988
Moody Radio